Caladenia richardsiorum, commonly known as the little dip spider orchid, Richards' spider orchid or robe spider orchid, is a plant in the orchid family Orchidaceae and is endemic to South Australia. It is a ground orchid with a single erect, hairy leaf and usually only one yellowish-green flower. It is similar to the endangered Mellblom's spider orchid (Caladenia hastata) but has a much larger leaf and the petals lack glandular tips.

Description
Caladenia richardsiorum is a terrestrial, perennial, deciduous, herb with an underground tuber and a single, erect, hairy leaf. There are six rows of reddish calli with cream-coloured tips along the labellum mid-line. Flowering occurs from late September to early November.

Taxonomy and naming
Caladenia richardsiorum  was first formally described in 1991 by David Jones and the description was published in Australian Orchid Research. The specific epithet (richardsiorum) honours Helen and Barry Richards for their assistance to Jones.

Distribution and habitat
The little dip spider orchid occurs in coastal areas mainly between Southend and the Coorong growing in heath and woodland.

Conservation
Caladenia richardsiorum is classified as "endangered" under the Australian Government Environment Protection and Biodiversity Conservation Act 1999 and the South Australian Government National Parks and Wildlife Act (1972). The main threats to the species include land clearance, weed invasion and grazing by rabbits.

References

richardsiorum
Plants described in 1991
Endemic orchids of Australia
Orchids of South Australia
Taxa named by David L. Jones (botanist)